Tin Fu is an MTR Light Rail stop. It is located at the ground of Tin Shui Road, next to Tin Fu Court, in Tin Shui Wai, Yuen Long District. The distance between it and Chung Fu stop is the shortest in the current Light Rail system. It began service on 7 December 2003 and belongs to Zone 5A.

References

MTR Light Rail stops
Former Kowloon–Canton Railway stations
Tin Shui Wai
Railway stations in Hong Kong opened in 2003
MTR Light Rail stops named from housing estates
2003 establishments in Hong Kong